Aap ki Kaneez is a 2015 Pakistani drama serial that originally aired on Geo Entertainment from 15 September 2014 to 23 March 2015, for twenty six episodes. It was directed by Amir Yousaf, written by Faiza Iftikhar and stars Alyy Khan, Shamim Hilaly, Atiqa Odho and Yumna Zaidi in pivotal roles.  At the 15th Lux Style Awards it received a Best TV Director nomination for Amir Yousaf. It later aired on GEO Kahani. It is also available on Amazon Prime Video since late 2019.

Synopsis 
Aap Ki Kaneez revolves around a wealthy businessman, Shah Mir Afandi who has lost his wife, Shireen while giving birth to their daughter Parniyan 12 years ago, however, Shah Mir's love for his wife is still alive in his heart as he never forgets to celebrate their wedding anniversary. Despite Shireen being a divorcee and a mother of a thirteen-year-old boy earlier, Shah Mir was unaffected by her past. Shireen's death leaves an unimaginable void in Shah Mir's life however, his life is turned upside down when a failed kidnapping takes place against him.

A kidnapping encounter against Shah Mir forces him to marry his servant's daughter Kaneez who is half his age and is uneducated. Reluctant to inform his family about his relation with Kaneez things slowly escalate in a series of consequences as Kaneez tries to oblige everyone through her actions.

Will Kaneez sacrifice everything in order to adjust to her new household?

Cast
 Alyy Khan as Shah Mir afandi
 Shamim Hilaly as Amma Jee
 Atiqa Odho as Shireen
 Yumna Zaidi as Kaneez
 Sohail Asghar as Maali Baba
 Farah Nadir as Aruj
 Gul-e-Rana
 Ayesha Toor as Safeena
 Mohammad Ali Khan
 Zainab Jameel as Arzoo
 Iman

Soundtrack 
The original soundtrack of Aap Ki Kaneez is composed by Ahsan Ali Taj while the lyrics and vocals are provided by Rahat Inayat Ali. The song is available on Patari.

Awards and nominations

References

External links 
 

Geo TV original programming
2014 Pakistani television series debuts
2015 Pakistani television series endings
Pakistani drama television series
Urdu-language television shows